The Birifor people (also Birifo or Malba) are an ethnic group of about 200,000 in West Africa, primarily located in northern Ghana, southern Burkina Faso, and northern Côte d'Ivoire.

See also 
 Birifor language

References 

Ethnic groups in Ghana
Ethnic groups in Burkina Faso
Ethnic groups in Ivory Coast